Paul Field (born 24 June 1967) is an English bobsledder who competed in the 1992 and 1994 Winter Olympics.  In 1992 he came seventh in the Men's Four along with teammates Mark Tout, George Farrell and Lenox Paul.  In 1994 he came joint tenth. He is also well known as the 1994 UK Gladiators men's champion, as well as the runner-up in the first International Gladiators competition behind America's Wesley Two Scoops Berry, albeit in controversial circumstances following a severe albeit unintentional tackle by American gladiator Hawk, during the Powerball event in the Grand Final. Because of his successful achievements and all-round good sportsmanship, he is still highly regarded amongst fans of the series, and is known as one of the greatest contenders in the history of Gladiators as a global franchise, especially during its mid '90s heyday.

Paul Field grew up in Hemel Hempstead where he competed for Dacorum Athletics Club. In the 1980s he was the third ranked British decathlete behind Daley Thompson.

References

External links
 
 1992 bobsleigh four-man results
 1994 bobsleigh two-man results
 1994 bobsleigh four-man results
 British Olympic Association profile

1967 births
Sportspeople from Hemel Hempstead
Sportspeople from Watford
Bobsledders at the 1992 Winter Olympics
Bobsledders at the 1994 Winter Olympics
English male bobsledders
Living people
Olympic bobsledders of Great Britain
Gladiators (1992 British TV series)